The Close Mansion, also known as the Close House, was one of the great mansions of Iowa City, Iowa, USA, and is listed on the National Register of Historic Places. It was built in 1874 at a cost of around $15,000. The mansion is located at the corner of Gilbert and Bowery in Iowa City. The Close family was involved in a linseed oil company and a glove factory, both of which were located near that home.

Uses of the home
After the Close family sold the home it was used by Acacia Fraternity and later was occupied by the Johnson County Department of Social Welfare. During the years of the home's renovation, several of the Italianate-style characteristics were removed, including the widows walk, the front balconies and the glassed-in cupola. The red brick of the house was temporarily painted gray but the paint has since been removed. The cupola and balconies have since been restored to the home. The Close Mansion currently houses Public Space One, a community driven, non-profit contemporary arts center.

References

National Register of Historic Places in Iowa City, Iowa
Houses on the National Register of Historic Places in Iowa
Italianate architecture in Iowa
Houses completed in 1874
Houses in Iowa City, Iowa